The George S. Eccles 2002 Legacy Bridge is a pedestrian bridge on the University of Utah campus in Salt Lake City, Utah, United States. The bridge was complete in 2001.

References

External links

 

Bridges completed in 2001
Bridges in Utah
Buildings and structures in Salt Lake City
Pedestrian bridges in the United States
University of Utah